<onlyinclude>This list of continuous bridge spans ranks the world's continuous truss bridges in two First by the length of main span (the longest length of unsupported roadway) and second by the total length of continuous truss spans.

This list includes bridges that act primarily as a continuous truss. These bridges may appear to be—or may incorporate elements of—a different design. For example, the list includes the Francis Scott Key Bridge which incorporates an arch shape into the design, but is continuous across multiple spans. The Key Bridge acts first as a continuous truss bridge and secondarily as an arch bridge. This list does not include cantilever bridges.

Only bridges that are currently in use are included in the rankings. Bridges currently being planned, designed, or constructed and bridges that have been demolished are noted separately.

List ranked by length of main span 

The length of main span is the most common method of comparing the size of bridges. The length of the main span will often correlate with the depth of the truss (height  the truss from bottom to top) and the engineering complexity involved in designing and constructing the bridge.

For bridges that have the same span length, the older bridge is listed first.

Note: Click on each bridge's rank to go to the bridge's official Web site. Ranks with a red asterisk (*) do not have official Web sites (or they do not have an English-language version) and are linked instead to a reference entry.

List ranked by total length 

It is also possible to rank continuous truss bridges by the sum of the continuous spans. 

Note that if the bridge has an expansion joint (a discontinuity), the sections of the bridge would be considered separate (by the definition of a continuous bridge) for the purposes of this ranking. The Yoshima Bridge is an example of this. It consists of two continuous-truss sections that together have five total spans. The first section (or unit) is 2-span continuous, 125 m + 137 m; the second section is a 3-span unit, 165 m + 245 m + 165 m.

History of the record span

See also

References
 Durkee, Jackson, "World's Longest Bridge Spans", National Steel Bridge Alliance, May 24, 1999
 
 
 Lewis, Scott (2016-01-05). "The World's Ten Longest Continuous Truss Bridges". New York: Engineering News-Record.
 Janberg, Nicolas, Truss bridges, Structurae.de (an extensive database of structures)

Footnotes

Continuous truss bridges, List of largest
Continuous truss bridges, List of largest
Continuous truss bridges, List of largest
Lists of construction records
Bridges, continuous truss